Isabelle Iliano (born 2 March 1997) is a Belgian footballer who plays as a defender for Dutch Eredivisie club Fortuna Sittard and the Belgium national team.

Club career
In Belgium, Iliano played for KAA Gent in the BeNe League and for Club Brugge in the Belgian Women's Super League.

In 2022, Iliano moved to Fortuna Sittard to play in the Dutch Eredivisie.

International career
Iliano has represented Belgium at under-17 and under-19 levels. She capped at senior level on 22 November 2014, in a 4–1 away win against Poland.

References

External links
 

1997 births
Living people
Belgian women's footballers
Women's association football midfielders
K.A.A. Gent (women) players
BeNe League players
Belgium women's international footballers
Club Brugge KV (women) players
Fortuna Sittard (women) players
Eredivisie (women) players